The Screen Actors Guild Award for Outstanding Performance by a Stunt Ensemble in a Motion Picture is one of the awards given by the Screen Actors Guild. The award recognizes the work of stunt performers and coordinators and was first presented at the 14th Screen Actors Guild Awards for performances by SAG's members in 2007 films.

There is a corresponding SAG Award for work in television.

Winners and nominees

Legend:

2000s

2010s

2020s

References

Stunt Ensemble Motion Picture
Stunt awards
Awards established in 2008